This is the electoral history of Steve Bullock, who served as Governor of Montana from 2013 to 2021. He previously served as the Attorney General of Montana from 2009 to 2013. Bullock sought the 2020 Democratic nomination for President, but ended his campaign before voting began. He was a candidate in the 2020 United States Senate election in Montana, losing to incumbent Steve Daines.

Montana Attorney General elections

2000

2008

Montana gubernatorial elections

2012

2016

2020 Democratic party presidential primaries

Despite ending his campaign before voting began, Bullock still appeared on the ballot in New Hampshire and Arkansas.

New Hampshire

Arkansas

†Candidate withdrew after early voting started.

United States Senate election

2020

References 

Steve Bullock (American politician)
Bullock, Steve